
Bauer is a German surname meaning "peasant" or "farmer".

Notable people sharing the surname "Bauer"

A
 Amanda Bauer (born 1979), American professional astronomer and science communicator
 André Bauer (born 1969), American politician
 Andreas Bauer Kanabas, German bass
 Antun Bauer (disambiguation), several people

B
 Belinda Bauer (disambiguation), several people
 Bill Bauer (American football), American football coach
 Bill Bauer (poet) (1932–2010), Canadian poet
 Billy Bauer (1915–2005), American musician
 Bobby Bauer (1915–1964), Canadian ice hockey player
 Branko Bauer (1921–2002), Croatian film director
 Bruno Bauer (1809–1882), German philosopher, theologian and historian

C
 Carl W. Bauer (1933–2013), American politician
 Catalina Bauer (born 1976), Chilean artist
 Charita Bauer (1922–1985), American soap opera actress
 Chris Bauer (born 1966), American actor
 Christian Bauer (born 1977), French chess player
 Christina Bauer (born 1988), French volleyball player
 Conny Bauer (born 1943), free jazz trombonist
 Craig Bauer, American Grammy Award-winning mixing engineer and record producer

D
 David Bauer (disambiguation), several people
 Denise Bauer (born 1964), American diplomat
 Donna Bauer (born 1970), Australian politician

E
 Eddie Bauer (1899–1986), American clothing manufacturer
 Edmond Bauer (1880–1963), French physicist
 Emily Bauer (born 1981), American singer, dancer, actress/voice actress
 Erich Bauer (1900–1980), Nazi SS Guard at Sobibor death camp during World War II
 Ernst Bauer (disambiguation), several people

F
 Felice Bauer (1887–1960), fiancée of Franz Kafka
 Ferdinand Bauer (1760–1826), Austrian botanical illustrator; brother of Franz 
 Frank S. Bauer (1856-1936), American politician
 Frans Bauer (born 1973), Dutch singer
 Franz Bauer (1758–1840), Austrian botanical illustrator; brother of Ferdinand
 Friedrich L. Bauer (1924–2015), German computer scientist

G
 Gary Bauer (born 1946), American conservative politician
 George J. Bauer (1871–1942), American politician
 Georg Bauer, better known as Georgius Agricola (1490–1555), German scholar
 Gustav Bauer (1870–1944), German Social Democratic chancellor in the early days of the Weimar Republic
 Gustav Conrad Bauer (1820–1906), German mathematician
 Gustave Bauer (1884–1947), American wrestler

H
 Hank Bauer (1922–2007), American baseball player
 Harold Bauer (1873–1951), English pianist
 Harold W. Bauer (1908–1942), American aviator and lieutenant colonel in the United States Marine Corps

I
 Ida Bauer (1882–1945), a hysterical patient of Sigmund Freud known as Dora

J
 Jack Bauer (disambiguation), several people
 John Bauer (disambiguation), several people
 Jon Bauer, Canadian Christian songwriter
 José Carlos Bauer (1925–2007), Brazilian footballer
 Julia Bauer, German coloratura soprano
 Jutta Bauer (born 1955), German illustrator

K
 Katharina Bauer (born 1990), German pole vaulter
 K. Jack Bauer (1926–1987), American historian
 Klemen Bauer (born 1986), Slovenian biathlete
 Kristin Bauer van Straten (born 1973), American actress

L
 Laurie Bauer (born 1949), British linguist
 Lorna Bauer, (born 1980), Canadian artist
 Lukáš Bauer (born 1977), Czech cross country skier

M
 Marion Bauer (1882–1955), American composer
 Martin Bauer, social psychologist
 Max Hermann Bauer (1869 – 1929) German staff officer in World War I 
 Michelle Bauer (born 1958), bondage model and actress

N
 Nancy Bauer (born 1934), Canadian writer
 Nicole Bauer (born 1987), German politician

O
 Otto Bauer (1881–1938), Austrian Social Democratic theoretician and politician

P
 Peter Bauer (computer specialist) (born 1957)
 Peter Thomas Bauer (1915–2002), Hungarian-born economist

R
 Ralph Norman Bauer (1899–1963), American politician
 Riccardo Bauer (1896–1982), Italian journalist and politician
 Rudolf Bauer (disambiguation), several people

S
 Siegfried Bauer (1961-2018), German physicist
 Stanley J. Bauer (1913–1972), New York state senator
 Steve Bauer, Canadian professional cyclist
 Steven Bauer, American actor
 Sven H. Bauer, International Commissioner of the Svenska Scoutrådet, the Swedish national Scouting federation

T
 Trevor Bauer (born 1991), professional baseball pitcher
 Tom Bauer (born 1946), American lawyer and politician
 Truus Bauer (1946–2013), Dutch rower

V
 Viola Bauer (born 1976), German skier

W
 Walter Bauer (1877–1960), theologian and ancient Greek philologist
 Wilhelm Bauer (1822–1875), German U-boat engineer
 William Bauer (disambiguation), several people
 Willy Bauer, German motocross driver in the 1970s
 Wolf Bauer (born 1939), German politician 
 Wolfgang Bauer (disambiguation), several people

Y
 Yehuda Bauer (born 1926), Czech-Israeli Holocaust historian
 Yevgeni Bauer (1865–1917), Russian silent film director

Fictional characters 

 From the American television series 24
 Graem Bauer
 Jack Bauer
 Josh Bauer (24)
 Kim Bauer
 Marilyn Bauer
 Phillip Bauer
 Teri Bauer
 From the American television series Boston Legal
 Denise Bauer
 From the American television series Community
 June Bauer
 From the American television series Guiding Light
 Beth Bauer
 Ed Bauer
 Michelle Bauer Santos
 From indie film Fear Clinic
 Bauer

See also
Bauers, a similar surname
Bower (surname)
Bowers (surname)

German-language surnames
Jewish surnames
Occupational surnames